Morgana Lefay (known as Damage from 1986 until 1989) is a Swedish power/thrash metal band from Bollnäs. It is named after Morgan Le Fay of the Arthurian cycle.

History
Morgana Lefay independently released their first album, Symphony of the Damned, in 1990. The success of the album allowed the band to tour and eventually landed them with Black Mark Records.

In 1997, Morgana Lefay disbanded. Persson, Heder and Söderlind kept the name. Meantime, Rytkönen and Eriksson were joined by drummer Robin Engström (formerly of M.I.D., Dark Tranquillity and Fantasmagoria) and continued under the name Lefay, changing their record label to Noise Records. After releasing three albums, they got back the name Morgana Lefay when they returned to Black Mark Records. The albums The Seventh Seal, Symphony of the Damned re-symphonised and S.O.S were made when the band was called Lefay. In 1999, a self-titled album was made with Thomas Persson on guitar.

In May 2006, drummer Robin Engström left the band because of 'personal differences'. Later that month, Pelle Åkerlind became the new permanent drummer. In late August 2006, the band went into Studio Soundcreation to record a new album, titled Aberrations of the Mind. It was released in March 2007 and was the first album with Åkerlind on drums.

Members

Current 
 Charles Rytkönen – vocals (1989–present)
 Tony Eriksson – guitars (1989–present)
 Peter Grehn – guitars, backing vocals (1998–present)
 Fredrik Lundberg – bass, backing vocals (2003–present)
 Pelle Åkerlind – drums, backing vocals (2006–present)

Former 
 Stefan Jonsson – guitars (1986–1989)
 Tommi Karppanen – guitars (1989–1994)
 Daniel Persson – guitars (1994–1997)
 Joakim Lundberg – bass (1986–1991)
 Joakim Heder – bass (1991–1997)
 Micke Åsentorp – bass [The "Lefay" years] (1997–2003)
 Jonas Söderlind – drums (1986–1997)
 Robin Engström – drums (1998–2006)

Discography

Studio albums

Singles and demos

Compilations

See also 
Morgan le Fay in modern culture

References

External links 
Official website (archived)

Black Mark Records
Interview with Pelle Akerlind, 2013

Musical groups established in 1989
Swedish power metal musical groups
Swedish rock music groups
Swedish thrash metal musical groups
Noise Records artists
Black Mark Production artists

eu:Morgana